Garden of the Arcane Delights - The John Peel Sessions is a compilation coupling the re-issue of the first and only EP by Australian band Dead Can Dance and two different sessions for the BBC Radio One John Peel show. It was released in November 2016 on record label 4AD with the Peel-supervised recordings allowed by arrangement with BBC Music.

Background 

The cover art is a sketch done by Brendan Perry and represents the themes of the song "The Arcane" as per the initial EP. As Perry explains:

The naked blindfolded figure, representing primal man deprived of perception, stands, within the confines of a garden (the world) containing a fountain and trees laden with fruit. His right arm stretches out – the grasping for knowledge – towards a fruit bearing tree, its trunk encircled by a snake. In the garden wall – the wall between freedom and confinement – are two gateways: the dualistic notion of choice. It is a Blakean universe in which mankind can only redeem itself, can only rid itself of blindness, through the correct interpretation of signs and events that permeate the fabric of nature's laws.

Track listing

References

External links 

 
 

2016 compilation albums
Dead Can Dance albums
4AD compilation albums